Nové Město na Moravě is a town in Žďár nad Sázavou District in the Vysočina Region of the Czech Republic. It has about 9,800 inhabitants. It is known as a winter sports resort. The historic town centre is well preserved and is protected by law as an urban monument zone.

Administrative parts
Villages of Hlinné, Jiříkovice, Maršovice, Olešná, Petrovice, Pohledec, Rokytno, Slavkovice and Studnice are administrative parts of Nové Město na Moravě.

Etymology
The name of the town literally means "New Town in Moravia".

Geography
It lies in the Křižanov Highlands, in the highest parts of the whole Bohemian-Moravian Highlands. Most of the municipal territory is located in the Žďárské vrchy Protected Landscape Area.

History
The first written mention of Nové Město na Moravě is from 1267 under the name Bočkov. It was founded during the colonization by royal burgrave Boček of Obřany after the nearby Cistercian monastery in Žďár nad Sázavou was established in 1252, not later than in 1255. The name Nové Město was used for the first time in a deed of King Wenceslaus II from 1293 and it was first referred to as a market town.

In 1312, Nové Město was inherited by lords of Lipá. Probably in the late 14th century, they had built a fortress here. In 1496, it was acquired by William II of Pernštejn. During the rule of the Pernštejn family, the Renaissance town hall was built and the fortress was rebuilt into a Renaissance castle. The Pernštejn family owned Nové Město until 1588. The next owners were Vilém Dubský, who reconstructed the castle, Archbishop Franz von Dietrichstein, or the Kratzer family, who took care of the economic prosperity of the manor and supported glass making and ironworks on the manor.

At the end of the 19th century, skiing developed, thanks to which the town became a centre of winter sports. The railway was built in 1905.

Demographics

Economy
There is a hospital in the town, which is the main employer.

Despite its mountainous location, the town has a long tradition of manufacturing. Among the significant employers are Sporten, producer of ski equipment, and Medin, producer of medical instruments. Other production includes wireless communication modems by Racom.

Transport
Nové Město na Moravě is a hub of many local roads, crossed by a first class road No. 19. The town also lies on a local railway line from Tišnov to Žďár nad Sázavou.

Sport

The town is a prominent Czech winter sports resort. The Vysočina Aréna hosted the 2013 Biathlon World Championships and since the 2011–12 season, the Biathlon World Cup event has been held here more or less regularly.

It also hosted events of the Tour de Ski in 2007–08 and 2008–09.

Mountain bike races are also being organised in Nové Město na Moravě, hosting races at the UCI Mountain Bike World Cup level as well as the cross-country event of the 2016 UCI Mountain Bike & Trials World Championships.

The local football club SFK Vrchovina plays in the Moravian-Silesian Football League, the third tier of the Czech football system.

Sights

In the middle of the historic centre is the Vratislavovo Square, named after Vratislav of Pernštejn, where most of the landmarks of the town are located. The elongated square is lined with Renaissance, Baroque and Neoclassical houses. 

In the middle of the square is the Church of Saint Cunigunde, the oldest monument in the town. The first mention of the church is from 1362. It has façade sgraffito decoration by native artist Karel Němec from 1928–1929. There is also a fountain by Karel Němec on the square.

The castle in Nové Město na Moravě was baroque rebuilt in the 18th century, and in the Neo-Renaissance style in 1874. Nowadays the building houses the Horácko Gallery that focuses on glassmaking, landscaping and 20th century sculpture.

The Renaissance building of the former town hall now serves as the Horácko Museum.

Notable people

Josef Vratislav Monse (1733–1793), historian
Jan Štursa (1880–1925), sculptor
Oldřich Blažíček (1887–1953), painter
Jaromír Nečas (1888–1945), politician
Ivan Sekanina (1900–1940), journalist, lawyer and resistance fighter
Vincenc Makovský (1900–1966), sculptor
František Balvín (1915–2003), cross-country skier
George Brady (1928–2019), Holocaust survivor and brother of Hana Brady
Hana Brady (1931–1944), Jewish girl murdered in the Holocaust, subject of documentary and children's book Hana's Suitcase
Miroslava Němcová (born 1952), politician
Pavel Tlustoš (born 1955), agrochemist
Vladimír Havlík (born 1959), action artist, painter
Ivo Strejček (born 1962), politician
Radek Jaroš (born 1964), mountaineer and author
Ivana Zemanová (born 1965), First Lady of the Czech Republic
Martin Koukal (born 1978), cross-country skier
Martina Sáblíková (born 1987), speed skater
Martin Nečas (born 1999), ice hockey player

Twin towns – sister cities

Nové Město na Moravě is twinned with:
 Mizhhiria, Ukraine
 Waalre, Netherlands
 Ziano di Fiemme, Italy

References

External links

Official tourist portal

Cities and towns in the Czech Republic
Populated places in Žďár nad Sázavou District
Ski areas and resorts in the Czech Republic